Daryaoganj is a town situated in Kasganj district of Uttar Pradesh state in India. Daryaoganj comes under the Majhola Gram Panchayat, its Vidhan Sabha Region & Block is Patiyali and the Lok Sabha Region is Etah. The Postal Index Number of Daryaoganj is 207244 and comes under Patiyali postal region. The holy river Ganga passes about 12 km away from this town.

History 
In the early 19th century, Daryaoganj came in existence. The first resident of this town was Lala Shri Kedar Nath Gupta with his three sons Shri Raghuveer Sahay Gupta, Shri Jeeva Ram Gupta and Shri Het Ram Gupta, and a daughter who was married to Shri Rajaram Gupta in Ganjdundwara. A Deshi Ghee Sweet Corner of Shri Kedar Nath was the first shop of this town.

This town was part of the kingdom of Awagarh's king.

According to ancient stories, at the time of Mahabharat, King Drupad (राजा द्रुपद) of Paanchal (पांचाल) state had donated a piece of his land to Guru Dronacharya (गुरू द्रॊणाचार्य). Daryaoganj is part of that donated land. 
Daryaoganj is the place where the great saint Markandeya lived ever, and the traces of his existence can be seen even today.

During the founding of Daryaoganj town, the location of Railway Station was the main factor which enhanced the importance of its locality.
At present time, Daryaoganj is an emerging town as it is situated at main district highway from Soron to Saray Agahat via Sahawar, Ganjdundwara, Patiyali, Aliganj.

In its beginning, Daryaoganj was the part of district Etah but on 15 April 2008 another district was established by Sushri Mayawati former Chief Minister of Uttar Pradesh, first named Kanshi Ram Nagar but in 2012 renamed Kasganj by Shri Akhilesh Yadav.

Occupation 
At present time, the main occupation of this town is agriculture and retail business. Most of the people of this town are self-employed.

 Agriculture 
The major crops of this town are wheat, corn and mustard. It is a huge supplier of mangoes and guavas to the big mandis in Jaipur, Firozabad etc.

 Business 
A number of shops are situated in the market commonly known as Station Daryaoganj Market. Each and every type of daily use material can be bought from here. The people of nearby villages come here to fulfill their daily needs.

Transportation 
Daryaoganj is well connected by railway and road network.

1.RAILWAY
Daryaoganj is situated in between important railway track Kanpur (via Farrukhabad) to Mathura / Bareilly (via Kasganj) known as North Eastern Railway (NER) .Most of the local mail trains & all the passenger trains halt at Daryaoganj/(DRO) Railway Station.

2.ROAD
Daryaoganj is connected with Grand Trunk Road at Etah & Kurawali via Jaithara. It is situated at main district highway from Soron to Saray Agahat.The bus service of UPSRTC directly to Delhi & Agra is provided to this town.

Tourism 
In general, Daryaoganj is not a tourism point, but a lake known as Thana Daryaoganj Jheel (थाना दरयावगंज झील) situated at a short distance is a great picnic spot near Daryaoganj. The Gayatri Mandir (गायत्री मंदिर) of Gayatri Shakti Peeth Majhola (गायत्री शक्तिपीठ मझॊला) enhances the spiritual feelings in residents and has a great capacity to attract visitors in the town.

Every year in the month of April (after Navratri), the town becomes a tourist-hub as the great and auspicious fair of Shyaur known as Mela Devi Ji Shyaur (मॆला दॆवी जी श्यौर) starts. A great crowd reaches Daryaoganj to enjoy this fair, situated at a distance of 1.5 km north of the Railway Station of Daryaoganj.

The most interesting place in Daryaoganj is Markandeya Hrishi Aashram (मार्काण्डेय ऋषि आश्रम) which is 10 minutes from Daryaoganj Railway Station. In the memory of the great saint Markandeya, a huge Markandeya Dwar (मार्काण्डेय द्वार) is constructed at Aliganj road, which indicates towards the Aashram.

References

Cities and towns in Kasganj district